Eucalyptus parvula, commonly known as small-leaved gum, is a species of small tree that is endemic to south-eastern New South Wales. It has mostly smooth bark, elliptical to lance-shaped adult leaves but with many juvenile of intermediate leaves in the crown, flower buds in groups of seven, white flowers and cup-shaped fruit.

Description
It has smooth greyish bark that is shed in long ribbons, often with persistent rough, flaky or fibrous bark at the base of the trunk. The crown of mature trees characteristically contains large numbers of juvenile and intermediate leaves.

Flowering occurs from January to March and the flowers are white.

Taxonomy
Small-leaved gum was first formally described in 1909 by Richard Hind Cambage in Proceedings of the Linnean Society of New South Wales. Cambage gave it the name Eucalyptus parvifolia but that name had already been given to a fossil species by John Strong Newberry in 1895 and was therefore a nomen illegitimum. In 1991, Lawrie Johnson and Ken Hill changed the name to E. parvula. The specific epithet (parvula) is from Latin, meaning "very small".

Distribution and habitat
Eucalyptus parvula grassy in grassy woodland in cold, damp places on the Southern Tablelands near Badja Cathcart east of Cooma.

Conservation status
This eucalypt is listed as "vulnerable" under the Australian Government Environment Protection and Biodiversity Conservation Act 1999 and as "endangered" under the New South Wales Government Biodiversity Conservation Act 2016. The main threat to the species is grazing by domestic livestock.

Use in horticulture
Small-leaved gum has a compact, rounded shaped with branches close to the ground, making it an ideal specimen plant for small gardens. It is suitable for cold, damp situations and relatively resistant to pests and diseases. In cultivation in the UK, it has received the Royal Horticultural Society's Award of Garden Merit.

References

parvula
Myrtales of Australia
Flora of New South Wales
Trees of Australia
Plants described in 1991